This list of mines in the United Kingdom is subsidiary to the list of mines article and lists working, defunct and future mines in the country and is organised by the primary mineral output. For practical purposes stone, marble and other quarries may be included in this list.

References

United Kingdom
United k
Mines